Iron tetracarbonyl diiodide is the inorganic compound with the formula FeI2(CO)4.  The molecule features four carbonyl ligands and two iodides.  It is a low-spin complex of ferrous iron. As confirmed by X-ray crystallography, the compound has cis stereochemistry.  It is a black solid that is soluble in dichloromethane and related organic solvents.

Preparation and reactions
It is prepared by the reaction of molecular iodine with iron pentacarbonyl, following a procedure first reported by Hieber and Wirschung in 1940:
Fe(CO)5  +  I2  →  FeI2(CO)4  +  CO

Iron tetracarbonyl diiodide reacts with a variety of Lewis bases with displacement of one or two CO ligands.

References

Iodo complexes
Carbonyl complexes
Iron complexes